Spring Grove Area School District is a midsized, suburban, public school district located in Spring Grove, York County, Pennsylvania. According to 2000 federal census data, it serves a resident population of 24,401. By 2010, the district's population increased to 27,417 people. In 2009, the district residents’ per capita income was $20,078, while the median family income was $52,385. In the Commonwealth, the median family income was $49,501  and the United States median family income was $49,445, in 2010.

Schools

Elementary schools
Spring Grove Area School District currently operates three elementary schools.
New Salem Elementary School
Paradise Elementary School
Spring Grove Elementary School

Middle school
Spring Grove Area School District currently operates two junior high school. Intermediate is 5th and 6th grade, middle is 7th and 8th. 
Spring Grove Intermediate School
Spring Grove Middle School

High school
Spring Grove Area School District currently operates one senior high school.
Spring Grove Area High School

Extracurriculars
The district's students have access to a wide variety of clubs, activities and an extensive sports program.

Extracurricular activities available at Spring Grove include academics, such as Science Olympiad, Team America Rocketry Challenge, Student Launch Initiative, Envirothon, Vex Robotics, and Physics Olympics, and clubs, such as Key Club, GSA, Hacky Sack Club, Academic Booster club, Art Club, Book Club, Debate Club, Drama Club, Film Club, FBLA, Future Educators Club, History Club, Journalism, Link Crew, National Honor Society, Peer Mentoring, Physics Club, Power of One Club, Psychology Club, Project Harmony, Recycling Club, Rocket Scientists, SADD, Student Council, Ski Club, Spanish Club, Tech Squad, Tri-M Music Honor Society, Ultimate Frisbee, Yearbook, and York County Science and Engineering Fair.

Sports
The District funds:

Co-ed:
 Indoor Colorguard - KIDA
 Indoor Percussion - KIDA

Boys
Baseball - AAAA
Basketball- AAAA
Cross Country - AAA
Football - AAA
Golf - AAA
Lacrosse - AAAA
Soccer - AAA
Swimming and Diving - AAA
Tennis - AAA
Track and Field - AAA
Volleyball - AAA
Wrestling - AAA

Girls
Basketball - AAAA
Cheer - AAAA
Cross Country - AAA
Field Hockey - AAA
Golf - AAA
Lacrosse - AAAA
Soccer (Fall) - AAA
Softball - AAAA
Swimming and Diving - AAA
Girls' Tennis - AAA
Track and Field - AAA
Volleyball - AAA

Junior High School Sports

Boys
Basketball
Cross Country
Football
Track and Field
Wrestling	

Girls
Basketball
Cross Country
Field Hockey
Track and Field
Volleyball 

According to PIAA directory July 2012

References

School districts in York County, Pennsylvania